Miss Kazakhstan is a national beauty pageant in Kazakhstan. The pageant was founded in 1997, where the winners were sent to Miss Universe, Miss World and Miss Earth.

Titleholders

Miss Kazakhstan (1997-2019)

Miss Universe Kazakhstan (2015-2021)
Miss Kazakhstan Organization decided to crown Miss Universe Kazakhstan separately between 2015 and 2021. The winner was mostly coming from Miss Almaty Organization. On occasion, when the winner does not qualify (due to age) for either contest, a runner-up is sent.

Qazaqstan Miss (Begin 2021)
Miss Kazakhstan Organization decided to divide the Miss Kazakhstan winner into the 3 categories; Qazaqstan Miss Universe, Qazaqstan Miss World and Qazaqstan Miss Earth.

Titleholders under Miss Qazaqstan Organization

Qazaqstan Miss Universe

Miss Kazakhstan has started to send a Winner to Miss Universe from 2006. From 2006 to 2014 the winner of Miss Kazakhstan went to compete at Miss Universe. Between 2015 and 2018 the Miss Almaty Beauty Pageant acquired the franchise of Miss Universe under Miss Kazakhstan selected the main winner to Miss Universe; here Miss Almaty wore Miss Universe Kazakhstan title. Began 2019 the winner of Miss Kazakhstan returned to compete at Miss Universe. On occasion, when the winner does not qualify (due to age) for either contest, a runner-up is sent.

Qazaqstan Miss World

Miss Kazakhstan has started to send a delegate to Miss World from 1998. A Runner-up allows to compete at Miss World competition. Began 2015 the Miss Kazakhstan decided to send the main winner to Miss World pageant. On occasion, when the winner does not qualify (due to age) for either contest, a runner-up is sent.

Qazaqstan Miss Earth

Miss Kazakhstan has started to send a delegate to Miss Earth from 2001. On occasion, when the winner does not qualify (due to age) for either contest, a runner-up is sent.

References

External links
 Miss Kazakhstan Official Website

 
Kazakhstan
Kazakhstan
Beauty pageants in Kazakhstan
Miss